The Boeing Chinook is a large, tandem rotor helicopter operated by the Royal Air Force (RAF). A series of variants based on the United States Army's Boeing CH-47 Chinook, the RAF Chinook fleet is the largest outside the United States. RAF Chinooks have seen extensive service in the Falklands War, the Balkans, Northern Ireland, Iraq, and Afghanistan.

The Chinook, normally based at RAF Odiham in England, provides heavy-lift support and transport across all branches of the British armed forces. The RAF has a total of sixty Chinooks in active inventory as of 2015. In 2018, the UK issued a request to the United States to purchase sixteen additional aircraft. The Chinook is expected to remain in RAF service until the 2040s.

Design and development

Chinook HC1
In March 1967, the United Kingdom placed an order for fifteen Boeing Vertol CH-47B Chinook to replace the Royal Air Force's Bristol Belvedere HC.1 fleet. In British service the new aircraft was to be designated as the Chinook HC Mk 1 (also formatted as HC.1 or HC1) standing for Helicopter, Cargo Mark 1. However in November of that year, the order was cancelled in a review of defence spending.

UK Chinook procurement ambitions were revived in 1978 with an announced requirement for a new heavy-lift helicopter to replace the Westland Wessex. Thirty Chinooks were ordered at a price of US$200 million. These helicopters, comparable to the CH-47C with Lycoming T55-L-11E engines, were again designated Chinook HC1, and entered service in December 1980. Eight more HC1 were delivered from 1984 to 1986, with the CH-47D's Lycoming T55-L-712 turbo-shaft engines.

The replacement of the HC1s metal rotor blades with aluminium and glass fibre composite rotor blades saw these aircraft designated Chinook HC1B. All surviving aircraft were later returned to Boeing and updated to the Chinook HC2 standard for further service within the RAF.

Chinook HC2
The US Army's next generation Chinook, the CH-47D, entered service in 1982. Improvements from the CH-47C included upgraded engines, composite rotor blades, a redesigned cockpit to reduce pilot workload, redundant and improved electrical systems, an advanced flight control system (FCS) and improved avionics. The RAF returned their original HC1 fleet to Boeing for upgrading to CH-47D standard, the first of which returned to the UK in 1993.

Three additional HC2 Chinooks were ordered with delivery beginning in 1995. Another six were ordered in 1995 under the Chinook HC2A designation; the main difference between these and the standard HC2 was the strengthening of the front fuselage to allow the fitting of an aerial refuelling probe in future.

One Argentine CH-47C was captured during the Falklands War, and used by the RAF as a training aid. The rear fuselage was later used to repair a crashed RAF Chinook in 2003.

In 2006, the retirement dates for the HC2 and HC2A fleets were scheduled for 2015 and 2025 respectively, but if planned upgrades are made both types could expect to be flying until 2040.

Chinook HC3

Eight Chinook HC3 were ordered in 1995 as dedicated special forces helicopters, which were intended to be low-cost variants of the US Army's MH-47E. The HC3s include improved range, night vision sensors and navigation capability. The eight aircraft were to cost £259 million and the forecast in-service date was November 1998. Although delivered in 2001, the HC3 could not receive airworthiness certificates as it was not possible to certify the avionics software.

The programme was widely judged to be "a profoundly inept piece of procurement": Sir Peter Spencer, who as head of the Defence Procurement Agency inherited the project, said that the "original requirement was ... actually impossible.  I mean, there were 100 essential requirements. I read all of them. One of them said to give protection against any missile coming from any direction." Spencer later commented: "it is always hard to imagine why people think you would be able cost effectively to buy a bespoke requirement for a very small production run."

The avionics were unsuitable due to poor risk analysis and necessary requirements omitted from the procurement contract. The Times claimed that the Ministry of Defence (MOD) planned to perform software integration itself, without Boeing's involvement, in order to reduce costs. While lacking certification, the helicopters were only permitted to fly in visual meteorological conditions and subsequently stored in climate controlled hangars.

Air Forces Monthly reported in November 2006 that after protracted negotiations to allow them to enter service, the Defence Aviation Repair Agency would likely receive a contract to install the Thales "TopDeck" avionics system on the Chinook HC3s. However, the MOD announced in March 2007 that this so-called "Fix to Field" programme would be cancelled, and instead it would revert the helicopters' avionics to Chinook HC2/2A specification. The programme was estimated to cost £50–60 million. In June 2008, the National Audit Office issued a scathing report on the MOD's handling of the affair, stating that the whole programme was likely to cost £500 million by the time the helicopters enter service. On 6 July 2009, the first of the eight modified Chinook HC3s made its first test flight at MOD Boscombe Down as part of the flight testing and evaluation phase of the HC3 "reversion" programme.

Chinook HC4, HC5, HC6 and HC6A

A programme to upgrade forty-six Chinook HC2/2A and HC3 helicopters was initiated in December 2008. Known as Project Julius, it included new digital flight deck avionics based on the Thales TopDeck avionics suite, comprising new multifunction displays, a digital moving map display and an electronic flight bag, installation of a nose-mounted forward-looking infrared (FLIR) detector, and upgrading the engines to the more powerful T55-714 standard. Upgraded HC2/2A and HC3 aircraft were redesignated HC4 and HC5 respectively. Deliveries were expected to commence in 2011. The first conversion, a Chinook HC4, first flew on 9 December 2010. Initial operating capability status was reached in June 2012 with seven aircraft delivered.

The Chinook HC6 designation has been assigned to the twenty-four (later reduced to fourteen) CH-47F-derived Chinooks ordered in 2009. In December 2015, the fourteenth and final HC6 was delivered to the RAF.

In July 2017, it was announced that the thirty-eight Chinook HC4s were to be upgraded to a HC6A standard including the replacement of the analogue flight control systems with the Boeing Digital Automatic Flight Control System (DAFCS). By February 2022, no HC4 variants remained, with the fleet comprising HC5, HC6 and HC6A variants.

Operational history

Overview

RAF Chinooks have been widely deployed in support of British military engagements, serving their first wartime role in Operation Corporate, the Falklands War, in 1982. Chinooks were used in Operation Granby in the 1991 Gulf War, attached to large peace-keeping commitments in the Balkans, took part in Operation Herrick and Operation Toral as part of the War in Afghanistan between 2001 and 2021, and in Operation Telic in the 2003 Iraq War. They provide routine supply and support missions to the British military, notably in Operation Banner in Northern Ireland. The helicopter has also been of use in military humanitarian missions and the extraction of civilians from war-zones, such as the evacuation of Sierra Leone in 2000, and the evacuation from Lebanon in 2006.

One Chinook in particular, known by its original squadron code Bravo November, has come to widespread public recognition due to its remarkable service record. It has seen action in every major operation involving the RAF in the helicopter's almost 40-year service life, including the Falkland Islands, Lebanon, Germany, Northern Ireland, Iraq, and Afghanistan.

Falklands War
During the Falklands War, Chinooks were deployed by both the British and Argentinian forces. In April 1982, four Chinooks were loaded aboard the container ship MV Atlantic Conveyor bound for the Falkland Islands, to support the British operations. On 25 May 1982, the Chinook Bravo November was sent to pick up freight from HMS Glasgow. While the helicopter was airborne, Atlantic Conveyor was attacked by an Argentine Navy Dassault Super Étendard with an Exocet sea-skimming missile. Bravo November avoided the ship's destruction, assisted in the evacuation of the ship, and later landed on the aircraft carrier , gaining the nickname "The Survivor". Owing to the rapid spread of fire and smoke aboard Atlantic Conveyor after the Exocet strike, it was not possible to fly any of the helicopters that remained on the ship's deck.

One Argentine Army Chinook was captured intact by British Army after the surrender. RAF Chinooks were part of an estimated force of forty helicopters in the British task force, alongside Westland Sea King and Westland Wessex helicopters.

Post-war, four Chinooks were operated by "ChinDet"  (Chinook Detachment) which became No.1310 Flight in 1983. Subsequently, No. 78 Squadron was re-formed in 1986 from the merger of No. 1310 Flight and No.1564 Flight (Sea Kings) and operated two Chinooks as part of the Falklands Garrison. This was reduced to a single helicopter in the mid-1990s and the type was eventually withdrawn from the Falklands in 2006, in order to free up resources and aircraft for operations in Afghanistan.

Northern Ireland 
RAF Chinooks provided routine supply and support missions to the British military during Operation Banner in Northern Ireland. On 2 June 1994, a Chinook flying from RAF Aldergrove to Scotland crashed on the Mull of Kintyre, Scotland killing all 25 passengers and all four crew members, it is widely regarded as the RAF's fourth-worst peacetime disaster.

First Gulf War
The Chinook became a vital transit tool during the 1991 Gulf War in Iraq. They were used for moving troops into the region at the start of the conflict; a Chinook was used on 22 January 1991 to transport a Special Air Service (SAS) patrol on the infamous Bravo Two Zero mission. In the aftermath of the conflict as many as nine British Chinooks delivered food and supplies to thousands of Kurdish refugees from Iraq.

Kosovo

On 6 June 1999, two Chinooks of No. 7 Squadron left RAF Odiham in Hampshire, carrying paratroopers to join NATO forces serving in the Balkans; six more arrived the following week in Kosovo to support operations such as casualty evacuations and transporting vital supplies. On 12 June 1999, waves of Chinooks, escorted by Westland Lynx and American AH-64 Apache attack helicopters, were used to rapidly deploy British infantry forces into Kosovo as a part of NATO's first phase of deployment. On 10 August 1999, hundreds of Chinooks around the world, including those used by the British armed forces, were grounded due to cracking discovered in the landing gear of a British helicopter during routine inspection.

Sierra Leone 
In May 2000, several Chinook helicopters airlifted British and European Union citizens out of Freetown in Sierra Leone in an evacuation due to regional instability. In September 2000, Chinooks were being used to evacuate casualties from fighting in Freetown to RFA Sir Percivale, a support ship docked there.

Lebanon 
In July 2006, three Chinook helicopters of No. 27 Squadron deployed to RAF Akrotiri in Cyprus to evacuate British citizens from Lebanon; the squadron also flew the EU foreign affairs representative Javier Solana to Beirut at the start of the crisis.

Afghanistan

Chinook helicopters have been relied upon heavily to support the British forces in Afghanistan continuously since the start of the war in Afghanistan in 2001; Operation Snipe saw the helicopters used to assist the 1,000 British Commandos sweeping a region of southeastern Afghanistan. Due to the threat of improvised explosive devices (IEDs) scattered throughout the terrain by insurgents, transport helicopters have become highly valued and demanded units in this style of warfare. By April 2006, six Chinooks had been deployed by C-17A Globemaster III transport aircraft to Kandahar in Southern Afghanistan, in support of Operation Herrick. Two RAF Chinooks were lost in August 2009 during combat operations with the Taliban, one of which was brought down by enemy fire, in spite of warnings months before of Taliban plans to attack the helicopters.

The continued operation of the fleet was made more cost effective when maintenance and support regimes were altered in 2006 and 2007. On 15 December 2009, the British government announced its Future Helicopter Strategy including the purchase of twenty-four new build Chinooks, twenty-two to expand the force and two to replace losses in Afghanistan, to be delivered to the RAF from 2012. The number of additional Chinooks was cut by twelve in the Strategic Defence and Security Review 2010. This brought the total fleet size to sixty aircraft; as of 2009, the RAF had forty-eight Chinooks in inventory.

Northern Mali
In July 2018, three RAF Chinook helicopters were deployed to assist French forces in the Northern Mali conflict with logistics and troop movement.

Variants

Chinook HC1
New-build aircraft for the RAF based on the CH-47C, forty-one built.
Chinook HC1B
Modification of the forty-one HC1s with metal rotor blades, survivors converted to HC2.
Chinook HC2
Conversion by Boeing of thirty-two surviving HC1Bs to CH-47D standard, and three new build-aircraft
Chinook HC2A
Similar to the HC2 with strengthened fuselage using milled structure manufacturing techniques, six built.
Chinook HC3
Special forces variant based on the CH-47SD, eight built.
Chinook HC4
HC2/2A aircraft with upgraded engines and avionics under Project Julius. forty-six conversions planned.
Chinook HC5
HC3 aircraft with upgraded avionics under Project Julius and the replacement of the analogue flight control systems with the Boeing Digital Automatic Flight Control System (DAFCS).
Chinook HC6
New-build Chinooks announced in 2009, originally twenty-four aircraft, later reduced to fourteen (twelve new helicopters plus two attrition replacements). The final aircraft were delivered in December 2015.
Chinook HC6A
Upgrade of the HC4 Chinooks, with the replacement of the analogue flight control systems with the Boeing Digital Automatic Flight Control System (DAFCS).

Operators

RAF Odiham
No. 7 Squadron – Part of the Joint Special Forces Aviation Wing
No. 18(B) Squadron
No. 27 Squadron
No.  240 Operational Conversion Unit RAF – Joint Chinook and Puma HC1 Operational Conversion Unit, 1980 to 1993 

RAF Benson
No. 28 Squadron – Joint Chinook and Puma HC2 Operational Conversion Unit, 2015 onwards

Notable incidents and accidents
13 May 1986 Chinook HC1 ZA715 crashed in bad weather in the Falkland Islands. The helicopter, with four crew and twelve troops, crashed into a hill four miles from its destination. With rescuers hampered by blizzards, the personnel were recovered but one crew member had died shortly after the crash, and the co-pilot and a soldier died on the way to hospital. The board of inquiry concluded that the crew had become disorientated due to "white-out" conditions.
27 February 1987 Chinook HC1 ZA721 crashed in the Falkland Islands on a test flight following servicing. After leaving RAF Mount Pleasant, the helicopter was at a normal cruising speed and an altitude of between 300 and 700 feet when it nosed down and crashed into the ground about six kilometres south-east of the airfield; it was destroyed by a subsequent fire. The board of inquiry was unable to determine the exact cause but it may have been the forward-swivelling upper boost actuator jamming. All seven on board, three crew and four technicians, were killed.
6 May 1988 Chinook HC1 ZA672 hit a pier at Hannover Airport while taxiing into position in a confined space. Its front rotor struck the underside of Pier 10, causing the helicopter to rear up vertically and then fall on its side. A fire started at the rear of the fuselage and soon spread. Three crew members were killed and one had major injuries; the Chinook was destroyed.
2 June 1994

Chinook HC2 ZD576 crashed on the Mull of Kintyre, Scotland, killing all 25 passengers and all four crew members; the cause is disputed.
19 August 2009 Chinook HC2 ZA709  the Ministry of Defence announced that a Chinook made an emergency landing following a rocket propelled grenade (RPG) strike and subsequent engine fire after a cargo drop-off just north of Sangin in Helmand Province, Afghanistan. The Chinook flew two kilometres to a safe area before landing. None of the crew sustained any injuries and all evacuated the aircraft before they were rescued by a second Chinook on the same sortie. The damaged aircraft was then destroyed by coalition air strikes to prevent it falling into the hands of the Taliban.
30 August 2009 Chinook HC2 ZA673 made a hard landing while on operations near Sangin, Helmand province. It suffered damage to the undercarriage, nose and front rotor, but the crew and fifteen soldiers on board were unharmed. According to the Ministry of Defence it was not possible to safely recover the aircraft due to the location of the crash and it was destroyed with explosives deliberately. The cause of the hard landing is being investigated, although it is not thought to have been shot down.

Aircraft on display

83-24104 - Former US Army CH-47D forward section on display at Royal Air Force Museum London, modified to represent "Bravo November".
ZA717 - Chinook HC.1 preserved at Newark Air Museum in Winthorpe, England.
ZA718 - Chinook HC6A "Bravo November" on display at Royal Air Force Museum Cosford.

Specifications (Chinook HC2)

See also

References

Notes

Bibliography

External links

Boeing – H47 Chinook 
Royal Air Force – Chinook

Chinook (UK variants)
CH-47 Chinook
1980s United States helicopters
1980s United States military transport aircraft